Deh Divan (also Romanized as Deh Dīvān and Deh-e Dīvān; also known as Deh-e Deyūn, Hurkali, and Hūrkatī) is a village in Sarduiyeh Rural District, Sarduiyeh District, Jiroft County, Kerman Province, Iran. At the 2006 census, its population was 418, in 63 families.

References 

Populated places in Jiroft County